Franko may refer to:

 Franko (name), a given name and surname
 Franko (bishop of Poznań), 11th-century Polish bishop

 FranKo, a British pop rock band
 Franko: The Crazy Revenge, a 1994 computer game
 Franko Escarpment, Antarctica

See also 
 Franco (disambiguation)

ru:Франко
sl:Franko (priimek)